The Pumpkin Papers are a set of typewritten, handwritten, and microfilmed documents, stolen from the US federal government (thus information leaks) by members of the Ware Group and other Soviet spy networks in Washington, DC, during 1937-1938, withheld by courier Whittaker Chambers from delivery to the Soviets as protection when he defected.  The Pumpkin Papers featured frequently in criminal proceedings against Alger Hiss during the period of Hiss Case (August 1948 - January 1950).  The term "Pumpkin Papers" quickly became shorthand for the complete set of handwritten, typewritten, and microfilmed documents in newspapers.  Along with names like Richard Nixon, Alger Hiss, and Whittaker Chambers, the Pumpkin Papers is a name closely associated with the Hiss Case.

Background
For the Ware Group in Washington (1935-1938), Chambers couriered documents from federal officials to New York City to Soviet spymasters, the last of whom was Boris Bykov.  During early 1938, Chambers withheld some documents as life insurance as he readied to defect and go into hiding in April 1938.  According to Chambers, he put the documents in a manila envelope and asked his wife's nephew Nathan Levine to hide them (which Levine did, in a dumbwaiter in a Brooklyn home).  In 1939, Chambers came out of hiding and joined Time magazine, where he worked through 1948. 

On August 3, 1948, Chambers testified under subpoena before the House Un-American Activities Committee (HUAC) in Washington, DC, that he had been a Soviet courier in the 1930s.  He named former federal officials in the Ware Group cell, including:  John Abt, Nathan Witt, Lee Pressman, and Alger Hiss.  On August 5, Hiss appeared before HUAC and denied the allegations.  On August 20, Abt, Witt, and Pressman pled the Fifth, all three under advice of counsel Harold I. Cammer.  On April 27, Chambers asserted on Meet the Press, then a national radio show, that Hiss had been a communist; in late September, Hiss filed a slander suit in a federal court in Baltimore against Chambers for making that allegation publicly.

Events

According to the Central Intelligence Agency, the Pumpkin Papers added a "dramatic sequence of events."   Between April and November (when Chambers was asked to produce evidence of Hiss' CPUSA membership in the slander case), Chambers had flip-flopped on whether his Ware Group had engaged in espionage.  On November 17, 1948, Chambers surrendered the typewritten and handwritten documents to Hiss' lawyer William L. Marbury Jr. as part of pre-trial deposition in a slander case.  At Hiss' request, Marbury in turn surrendered the typewritten and handwritten documents (sometimes called the "Baltimore Documents") to the United States Department of Justice in the hope that Justice would indict Chambers for espionage.  The hard copy documents included summaries of United States Department of State documents in Hiss' handwriting as well as typewritten copies of official government reports.  On December 2, 1948, HUAC investigators arrived at Chambers' farm in Westminster, Maryland, and took from Chambers five canisters of microfilm, after he retrieved them from a pumpkin he had hollowed out overnight to keep them safe – hence the "Pumpkin Papers."  Nixon and HUAC investigation director Robert E. Stripling paraded the microfilm before the press.  In less than two weeks, instead of indicting Chambers, Justice indicted Hiss, in part because the collective Pumpkin Papers provided strong evidence of espionage on Hiss' part.  

During two trials against Alger Hiss in 1949, "the star witnesses were the Pumpkin Papers."  FBI analysis proved that typewritten copies had been typed on a Woodstock typewriter (No. 230099) belonging to the Hiss family.  The majority of handwritten documents were in Hiss' hand (the others being in the hand of Treasury official Harry Dexter White).  The Hiss defense team was unable to discredit the typewriter or typewritten documents during the trials.  In January 1950, a jury found Hiss guilty, and he went to prison.  

In 1950, Representative Nixon made a Pumpkin Papers speech to Congress, a few weeks after Senator Joseph McCarthy cited the Hiss Case, cited as the start of McCarthyism.

In 1950 for passage of the McCarran Internal Security Act, Senator Karl Mundt told a Senate hearing this act need to pass, based on what he had learned as a HUAC member about "the so-called pumpkin papers case, the espionage activities in the Chambers-Hiss case, the Bentley case, and others."

Legacy
Subsequent, scandalous documents whose name mirrors to the Pumpkin Papers include the Pentagon Papers (1971) and the Panama Papers (2016).

Media

In his 1949 book The Red Plot Against America, HUAC investigator Robert E. Stripling claimed that he had name the documents the "Pumpkin Papers."

The nascent conservative movement led by William F. Buckley Jr. lionized Chambers as a hero, and Buckley's magazine National Review (founded 1955) continues to mention the Pumpkin Papers regularly.

The Pumpkin Papers receive regular mention in the press, from local to national outlets.

Books in the Hiss Case starting coming out before the case itself finished in court and continued to come out in the 21st Century, all mentioning the Pumpkin Papers.  Richard Nixon, who rose to national fame during the Hiss Case, mentions the Pumpkin Papers in at least four of his own books. The name Pumpkin Papers even appear in book titles on its own.  Even the Pumpkin Papers Irregulars appear in a novel.

The Pumpkin Papers appeared in film as well.  Actor Cary Grant alludes to the Pumpkin Papers atop Mount Rushmore during the climax of Alfred Hitchcock's 1959 film North by Northwest when he tells actress Eve Marie Saint, "I see you've got the pumpkin" (in this case, a statue full of microfilm).  That same year, the Three Stooges movie Commotion on the Ocean includes  microfilm in a watermelon.

Pumpkin Papers Irregulars
This group (allegedly a "secret society") formed in New York City in 1977 by Paul Seabury with meetings notionally off-the-record.  Annually on the Thursday closest to Halloween it holds a dinner to announce the Victor Navasky Award for "most disloyal American."  Long-time members include Grover Norquist.  Members have included Buckely, Nixon, Ronald Reagan, Robert H. Bork, James Q. Wilson, and Clare Booth Luce.

Recipients of the group's annual "Victor Navasky Prize" include:  
 Writer Saul Alinsky
 Actress Jane Fonda
 Contractor Edward Snowden
 Senator Dianne Feinstein (2018)

Speakers have included:
 Philosopher Sidney Hook (1978)
 CIA Director William J. Casey (1984)
 Journalist John O'Sullivan (1990)
 Judge Laurence H. Silberman (2005)
 Senator Jon Kyl  and Writer Diana West (2013)
 Activist Steve Bannon (2017)
 Columnist Mary Anastasia O’Grady (2018)

A supporter of Alger Hiss and Harry Dexter White who has attended several dinners described a typical evening at the "one time secret institution."

References

External sources
 A Pumpkin Patch, a Typewriter, and Richard Nixon:  The Hiss-Chambers Espionage Case (podcast by John Berresford)
 AFIO  2014 announcement
 National Archives: Pumpkin Papers Canisters
 National Archives:  USA vs. Alger Hiss
 Encyclopedia Britannica
 Stanford University Pumpkin Papers in Sam Tanenhaus papers
 Famous Trials
 The Alger Hiss Story
 Shelby Addresses the 26th Meeting of the 'Pumpkin Papers Irregulars' (2003)

1948 documents
1938 documents
Classified documents
United States documents
Works subject to a lawsuit